Hong Kong competed at the 1988 Summer Olympics in Seoul, South Korea. 48 competitors, 38 men and 10 women, took part in 49 events in 11 sports. The use in the traditional Korean Hangul alphabet which placed last before the host nation in the Parade of Nations.

Competitors
The following is the list of number of competitors in the Games.

Archery

In its second Olympic archery competition, Hong Kong was represented by two men and a woman.  None advanced past the preliminary round.

Men

Women

Athletics

Men

Women

Canoeing

Men

Cycling

Five male cyclists represented Hong Kong in 1988.

Road

Men

Diving

 Men's 3 metre springboard

Fencing

Seven fencers, six men and one woman, represented Hong Kong in 1988.

Men's foil
 Choy Kam Shing
 Lee Chung Man
 Weng Tak Fung

Men's team foil
 Choy Kam Shing, Lee Chung Man, Tong King King, Weng Tak Fung

Men's épée
 Chan Kai Sang
 Tong King King
 Tang Wing Keung

Men's team épée
 Chan Kai Sang, Choy Kam Shing, Tang Wing Keung, Tong King King

Women's foil
 Yung Yim King

Judo

 Men's 60 kg
 Men's 65 kg
 Men's 71 kg
 Men's 78 kg
 Men's 86 kg

Sailing

 Men's Division II
 Finn
 Flying Dutchman

Shooting

 Men's 50 metre pistol

Swimming

Men's 50 m Freestyle
 Khai Kam Li
 Heat – 24.30 (→ did not advance, 35th place)
 Michael Wright
 Heat – 24.47 (→ did not advance, 39th place)

Men's 100 m Freestyle
 Michael Wright
 Heat – 53.64 (→ did not advance, 49th place)
 Khai Kam Li
 Heat – 53.70 (→ did not advance, 50th place)

Men's 200 m Freestyle
 Arthur Li
 Heat – 1:58.10 (→ did not advance, 51st place)
 Yi Ming Tsang
 Heat – 2:01.02 (→ did not advance, 56th place)

Men's 400 m Freestyle
 Arthur Li
 Heat – 4:18.50 (→ did not advance, 45th place)

Men's 100 m Backstroke
 Hor Man Yip
 Heat – 1:01.91 (→ did not advance, 42nd place)
 Kam Sing Watt
 Heat – 1:08.03 (→ did not advance, 52nd place)

Men's 100 m Butterfly
 Yi Ming Tsang
 Heat – 57.84 (→ did not advance, 39th place)

Men's 200 m Individual Medley
 Hor Man Yip
 Heat – 2:14.65 (→ did not advance, 40th place)
 Arthur Li
 Heat – 2:17.10 (→ did not advance, 48th place)

Men's 4 × 100 m Freestyle Relay
 Michael Wright, Khai Kam Li, Arthur Li, and Yi Ming Tsang
 Heat – 3:34.78 (→ did not advance, 16th place)

Men's 4 × 100 m Medley Relay
 Hor Man Yip, Kam Sing Watt, Yi Ming Tsang, and Michael Wright
 Heat – 4:05.28 (→ did not advance, 22nd place)

Women's 50 m Freestyle
 Cee Kay Hung
 Heat – 28.15 (→ did not advance, 35th place)
 Wing Sze Tsang
 Heat – 29.14 (→ did not advance, 45th place)

Women's 100 m Freestyle
 Cee Kay Hung
 Heat – 1:00.18 (→ did not advance, 42nd place)
 Fenella Ng
 Heat – 1:01.27 (→ did not advance, 45th place)

Women's 200 m Freestyle
 Fenella Ng
 Heat – 2:10.43 (→ did not advance, 36th place)
 Cee Kay Hung
 Heat – 2:13.61 (→ did not advance, 42nd place)

Women's 100 m Backstroke
 Wing Sze Tsang
 Heat – 1:10.50 (→ did not advance, 35th place)

Women's 100 m Butterfly
 Cee Kay Hung
 Heat – 1:06.94 (→ did not advance, 31st place)
 Annemarie Munk
 Heat – 1:08.35 (→ did not advance, 36th place)

Women's 200 m Individual Medley
 Annemarie Munk
 Heat – 2:34.32 (→ did not advance, 32nd place)

Women's 400 m Individual Medley
 Annemarie Munk
 Heat – 5:24.11 (→ did not advance, 29th place)

Women's 4 × 100 m Freestyle Relay
 Cee Kay Hung, Fenella Ng, Wing Sze Tsang, and Annemarie Munk
 Heat – 4:08.58 (→ did not advance, 14th place)

Table Tennis

 Men's singles
 Women's singles
 Men's doubles
 Women's doubles

References

External links
Official Olympic Reports

Nations at the 1988 Summer Olympics
1988
1988 in Hong Kong sport